Cecilia Wairimu (born 28 November 1980), better known by her stage name Amani, is a Kenyan singer and songwriter. Her contributions to the Kenyan music industry have earned her several coveted accolades, including the Best Female category at the 2009 MTV Africa Music Awards, Pearl of Africa Music Awards, Kisima Awards and Chaguo La Teeniez Awards. She released her debut album in 2006.

Career

Beginnings 
Amani attended Bishop Gatimu Ngandu Girls High School, where she was part of the accapella group Sobriety. She signed a record deal with Ogopa Deejays in 1999, right after graduating from high school. She enrolled at the United States International University in 2000 and studied international business administration.

Career breakthrough: 200006; Tamani 
Her debut single "Move On" was a radio hit. She released her follow-up singles "Tahidi" and "Papii" in 2001. Her 2002 collaboration with Nameless, titled "Ninanoki", was a major national hit. Her later singles include "Talk to You" (featuring Patonee and Big Pin), "Bad Boy" (featuring Nyashinski of Kleptomaniax), Usiwe Mbali (featuring AY), "Tamani", "Missing My Baby", and "Tonight".

She is currently the brand Ambassador for Airtel Kenya.

Her debut album, Tamani, was released in 2006. She has toured in the United States, Norway, Germany, United Kingdom, Namibia, Tanzania, and Uganda. Moreover, she has performed in Dubai, Nigeria, Senegal, South Africa, Liberia and Djibouti.

2010present: Grand comeback to music industry 
In 2010, Amani was featured on "Hands Across The World", a song written and produced by R Kelly. The song serves as the first release for the African supergroup One 8, composed of Amani, Ali Kiba, Navio, Fally Ipupa, 2face Idibia, JK, 4x4, and Movaizhaleine. Described as "an uplifting ballad" by Billboard's Diane Coetzer, the song was released by Rockstar 4000 Music Entertainment.

In 2013, she worked with Uganda's dancehall duo Radio & Weasel to release the song "Kiboko Changu", which serves as the lead single off her latest album. In 2015, she released the single "Kizungu Zungu". In July 2015, she released the reggae and dancehall-influenced song "Heartbreaker". Its music video was shot at Nairobi's Garden Estate and officially released on 8 September 2015.

Cecilia Wairimu got born again in 2018 with 'My God' and 'Upendo' being some of her songs as a born again Christian. This new leaf came as both a surprise and shock to her fans but she stated she was there to stay.

Discography

Singles and studio albums

Awards and nominations

Recognitions 
 Pure and Natural Most Inspiring Young Woman 2010.
 Pearl of Africa Music Award-Best Female Artist 2010

References

1980 births
Living people
People from Kiambu County
21st-century Kenyan women singers
Alumni of Bishop Gatimu Ngandu Girls High School
Kisima Music Award winners